Konacık can refer to:

 Konacık
 Konacık, Baskil
 Konacık, Gerger
 Konacık, Sur